Hanging Bridge is a medieval bridge spanning the Hanging Ditch, which connected the rivers Irk and Irwell in Manchester, England. The first reference to the bridge was in 1343, when it was called Hengand Brigge, but the present structure was built in 1421, replacing an earlier bridge. Material taken from Manchester's Roman fort may have been used in its construction. It has been speculated that the Hanging Ditch may be of Roman origin, part of a defensive circuit between the rivers Irk and Irwell.

The name may derive from the Old English hen, meaning wild birds, and the Welsh gan, meaning between two hills. A stream flowed through the ditch, from the Irk to the Irwellpossibly the lost River Dene, which gave its name to Deansgate. The bridge has two arches and was built using sandstone from Collyhurst. Hanging Bridge formed part of Manchester’s medieval defences, when it was the main route from Manchester to the cathedral, then a parish church.

In 1600 the Hanging Ditch was condemned as an insanitary open sewer, and in the following years the ditch was culverted and the bridge buried and built over. A directory published in 1772 recorded that nine houses had been built along the line of the bridge, suggesting that it may have been covered over during the first phase of Manchester's town planning, some time in the 1770s. The bridge was then forgotten, remembered only in the name of the area where it had stood, until its rediscovery and subsequent excavation as a result of demolition work carried out in the 1880s. The bridge was put on display, and in three months had about 32,000 paying visitors. It was once again covered up during the Victorian expansion of Manchester. More than 100 years later it was uncovered again, and following restoration work it went on display in 2002 as a main attraction of Manchester Cathedral's newly built visitor centre.

Today the bridge is largely hidden by modern buildings, but it can be seen in the basement of Manchester Cathedral Visitor Centre, where it forms one side of the refectory. The bridge is listed as a Scheduled Ancient Monument.

See also
History of Manchester
Scheduled Monuments in Greater Manchester

References
Notes

Bibliography

Buildings and structures in Manchester
Scheduled monuments in Greater Manchester